The following is a list of members of the United States Congress who have declared themselves to be socialists or have been a member of a socialist organization in the United States.

The First Red Scare and Second Red Scare, or McCarthy era, resulted in persecution of socialists, removal of socialists from unions, and weaker socialist electoral outcomes.

There are currently more socialists in Congress than any point in US history, most of whom are Democratic Socialists of America (DSA) members. In addition, DSA membership was less meaningful in the 1980s–1990's, when DSA was small and membership amounted to "left-wing insider baseball".

List of members of Congress 

:

Notable progressive but not socialist Congress members 
 Ayanna Pressley, a member of "The Squad", explicitly does not identify as socialist.
 Maxwell Frost, a progressive and the first Generation Z member of Congress, explicitly does not identify as socialist, saying "my family fled that".

See also 
 Other lists:
 List of elected socialist mayors in the United States
 List of Democratic Socialists of America public officeholders
 List of Green politicians who have held office in the United States (none at federal level)
 List of Communist Party USA members who have held office in the United States (none at federal level)
 History of the socialist movement in the United States
 The Squad (United States Congress)
 Congressional Progressive Caucus
 Millennial socialism

Endnotes

References 

 Members of Congress
Lists of political office-holders in the United States
Lists of members of the United States Congress
Socialism-related lists